The Guam Fed Cup team represents Guam in Fed Cup tennis competition and are governed by the Guam National Tennis Federation. They took part in the Fed Cup for the first time in 2020, competing in the Asia/Oceania Zone Group II. They lost their first Fed Cup match against the Philippines with their first win being their 3-0 victory over Turkmenistan in their second Fed Cup game. Prior to their Fed Cup debut in 2020, Guam was previously affiliated with the Pacific Oceania team.

Players

See also
 Fed Cup
 Guam at the Davis Cup

References

External links
 

Billie Jean King Cup teams
Fed Cup
Fed Cup